Nūr al-Dīn Maḥmūd Zengī (February 1118 – 15 May 1174), commonly known as Nur ad-Din (lit. "Light of the Faith" in Arabic), was a member of the Zengid dynasty, which ruled the Syrian province (Shām) of the Seljuk Empire. He reigned from 1146 to 1174. He is regarded as an important figure of the Second Crusade.

War against Crusaders

Nur ad-Din was the second son of Imad al-Din Zengi, the Turkmen atabeg of Aleppo and Mosul, who was a devoted enemy of the crusader presence in Syria. After the assassination of his father in 1146, Nur ad-Din and his older brother Saif ad-Din Ghazi I divided the kingdom between themselves, with Nur ad-Din governing Aleppo and Saif ad-Din Ghazi establishing himself in Mosul. The border between the two new kingdoms was formed by al-Khabur River. Almost as soon as he began his rule, Nur ad-Din attacked the Principality of Antioch, seizing several castles in the north of Syria, while at the same time he defeated an attempt by Joscelin II to recover the County of Edessa, which had been conquered by Zengi in 1144. In 1146, after the Frankish attempt to reoccupy Edessa, Nur ad-Din massacred the local Armenian Christian population of the city and destroyed its fortifications, in punishment for assisting Joscelin in this attempt. According to Thomas Asbridge, the women and children of Edessa were enslaved.

Nur ad-Din sought to make alliances with his Muslim neighbours in northern Iraq and Syria in order to strengthen the Muslim front against their Crusader enemies. In 1147, he signed a bilateral treaty with Mu'in ad-Din Unur, governor of Damascus. As part of this agreement, he also married Mu'in ad-Din's daughter Ismat ad-Din Khatun. Together Mu'in ad-Din and Nur ad-Din besieged the cities of Bosra and Salkhad, which had been captured by a rebellious vassal of Mu'in ad-Din named Altuntash, but Mu'in ad-Din was always suspicious of Nur ad-Din's intentions and did not want to offend his former crusader allies in Jerusalem, who had helped defend Damascus against Zengi. To reassure Mu'in ad-Din, Nur ad-Din curtailed his stay in Damascus and turned instead towards the Principality of Antioch, where he was able to seize Artah, Kafar Latha, Basarfut, and Bara.

In 1148, the Second Crusade arrived in Syria, led by Louis VII of France and Conrad III of Germany. Nur ad-Din's victories and the Crusader's losses in Asia Minor however had made the recovery of Edessa – their original goal – practically impossible. Given that Aleppo was too far off from Jerusalem for an attack and Damascus, recently allied with the Kingdom of Jerusalem against Zengi, had entered into an alliance with Nur ad-Din, the Crusaders decided to attack Damascus, the conquest of which would preclude a combination of Jerusalem's enemies. Mu'in ad-Din reluctantly called for help from Nur ad-Din, but the crusader siege collapsed after only four days.

Nur ad-Din took advantage of the failure of the Crusade to prepare another attack against Antioch. In 1149, he launched an offensive against the territories dominated by the castle of Harim, situated on the eastern bank of the Orontes, after which he besieged the castle of Inab. The Prince of Antioch, Raymond of Poitiers, quickly came to the aid of the besieged citadel. The Muslim army destroyed the Crusader army at the Battle of Inab, during which Raymond was killed, moreover, Raymond's head was sent to Nur ad-Din, who sent it along to the Caliph Al-Muqtafi in Baghdad. Nur ad-Din marched all the way to the coast and expressed his dominance of Syria by symbolically bathing in the Mediterranean. He did not, however, attack Antioch itself; he was content with capturing all Antiochene territory east of the Orontes and leaving a rump state around the city, which in any case soon fell under the suzerainty of the Byzantine Empire. In 1150, he defeated Joscelin II for a final time, after allying with the Seljuk Sultan of Rüm, Mas'ud (whose daughter he also married). Joscelin was blinded and died in his prison in Aleppo in 1159. In the Battle of Aintab, Nur ad-Din tried but failed to prevent King Baldwin III of Jerusalem's evacuation of the Latin Christian residents of Turbessel. In 1152, Nur ad-Din captured and burned Tortosa, briefly occupying the town.

Unification of sultanate

It was Nur ad-Din's dream to unite the various Muslim forces between the Euphrates and the Nile to make a common front against the crusaders. In 1149 Saif ad-Din Ghazi died, and a younger brother, Qutb ad-Din Mawdud, succeeded him. Qutb ad-Din recognized Nur ad-Din as overlord of Mosul, so that the major cities of Mosul and Aleppo were united under one man. Damascus was all that remained as an obstacle to the unification of Syria.

After the failure of the Second Crusade, Mu'in ad-Din had renewed his treaty with the crusaders, and after his death in 1149, his successor Mujir ad-Din Abaq followed the same policy. In 1150 and 1151, Nur ad-Din besieged the city, but retreated each time with no success, aside from empty recognition of his suzerainty. When Ascalon was captured by the crusaders in 1153, Mujir ad-Din forbade Nur ad-Din from travelling across his territory. Mujir ad-Din, however, was a weaker ruler than his predecessor, and he also agreed to pay an annual tribute to the crusaders in exchange for their protection. The growing weakness of Damascus under Mujir ad-Din allowed Nur ad-Din to overthrow him in 1154, with help from the population of the city. Damascus was annexed to Zengid territory, and all of Syria was unified under the authority of Nur ad-Din, from Edessa in the north to the Hauran in the south. He was cautious not to attack Jerusalem right away, and even continued to send the yearly tribute established by Mujir ad-Din; meanwhile he briefly became involved in affairs to the north of Mosul, where a succession dispute in the Sultanate of Rum threatened Edessa and other cities.

In 1157, Nur ad-Din besieged the Knights Hospitaller in the crusader fortress of Banias, routed a relief army from Jerusalem led by King Baldwin III, and captured Grand Master Bertrand de Blanquefort. However, he fell ill that year and the crusaders were given a brief respite from his attacks. In 1159, the Byzantine emperor Manuel I Comnenus arrived to assert his authority in Antioch, and the crusaders hoped he would send an expedition against Aleppo. However, Nur ad-Din sent ambassadors and negotiated an alliance with the emperor against the Seljuks, much to the crusaders' dismay. Nur ad-Din, along with the Danishmends of eastern Anatolia, attacked the Seljuk sultan Kilij Arslan II from the east the next year, while Manuel attacked from the west. Later in 1160, Nur ad-Din captured the Prince of Antioch, Raynald of Châtillon after a raid in the Anti-Taurus mountains; Raynald remained in captivity for the next sixteen years. By 1162, with Antioch under nominal Byzantine control and the crusader states further south powerless to make any further attacks on Syria, Nur ad-Din made a pilgrimage to Mecca. Soon after he returned, he learned of the death of King Baldwin III of Jerusalem, and out of respect for such a formidable opponent he refrained from attacking the crusader kingdom: William of Tyre reports that Nur ad-Din said "We should sympathize with their grief and in pity spare them, because they have lost a prince such as the rest of the world does not possess today."

The problem of Egypt

As there was now nothing the crusaders could do in Syria, they were forced to look to the south if they wanted to expand their territory. The capture of Ascalon had already succeeded in cutting off Egypt from Syria, and Egypt had been politically weakened by a series of very young Fatimid caliphs. By 1163, the caliph was the young al-Adid, but the country was ruled by the vizier Shawar. That year, Shawar was overthrown by Dirgham; soon afterwards, the King of Jerusalem, Amalric I, led an offensive against Egypt, on the pretext that the Fatimids were not paying the tribute they had promised to pay during the reign of Baldwin III. This campaign failed and he was forced to return to Jerusalem, but it provoked Nur ad-Din to lead a campaign of his own against the crusaders in Syria in order to turn their attention away from Egypt. His attack on Tripoli was unsuccessful, but he was soon visited by the exiled Shawar, who begged him to send an army and restore him to the vizierate. Nur ad-Din did not want to spare his own army for a defense of Egypt, but his Kurdish general Shirkuh convinced him to invade in 1164. In response, Dirgham allied with Amalric, but the king could not mobilize in time to save him. Dirgham was killed during Shirkuh's invasion and Shawar was restored as vizier.

Shawar immediately expelled Shirkuh and allied with Amalric, who arrived to besiege Shirkuh at Bilbeis. Shirkuh agreed to abandon Egypt when Amalric was forced to return home, after Nur ad-Din attacked Antioch and besieged the castle of Harenc. There, Nur ad-Din routed the combined armies of Antioch and Tripoli, but refused to attack Antioch itself, fearing reprisals from the Byzantines. Instead he besieged and captured Banias, and for the next two years continually raided the frontiers of the crusader states. In 1166, Shirkuh was sent again to Egypt. Amalric followed him at the beginning of 1167, and a formal treaty was established between Amalric and Shawar, with the nominal support of the caliph. The crusaders occupied Alexandria and Cairo and made Egypt a tributary state, but Amalric could not hold the country while Nur ad-Din still held Syria, and he was forced to return to Jerusalem. In 1167, Nur ad-Din raided the County of Tripoli, in which he temporarily captured Areimeh Castle, Chastel Blanc and Gibelacar, exploiting the captivity of Raymond III.

In 1168, Amalric sought an alliance with Emperor Manuel and invaded Egypt once more. Shawar's son Khalil had had enough, and with support from Caliph al-Adid requested help from Nur ad-Din and Shirkuh. At the beginning of 1169, Shirkuh arrived and the crusaders once more were forced to retreat. This time Nur ad-Din gained full control of Egypt. Shawar was executed and Shirkuh was named vizier of the newly conquered territory, later succeeded by his nephew Saladin. One last invasion of Egypt was launched by Amalric and Manuel, but it was disorganized and came to nothing.

Death and succession

During this time Nur ad-Din was busy in the north, fighting the Ortoqids, and in 1170 he had to settle a dispute between his nephews when his brother Qutb ad-Din died. After conquering Egypt, Nur ad-Din believed that he had accomplished his goal of uniting the Muslim states, he was seized by a fever due to complications from a peritonsillar abscess. He died at the age of 56 on 15 May 1174 in the Citadel of Damascus. He was initially buried there, before being reburied in the Nur al-Din Madrasa. His young son As-Salih Ismail al-Malik became his legitimate heir, and Saladin declared himself his vassal,  Syria and Egypt under his own rule.  defeated the other claimants to the throne and took power in Syria in 1185, finally realizing Nur ad-Din's dream.

Legacy
According to William of Tyre, although Nur ad-Din was "a mighty persecutor of the Christian name and faith," he was also "a just prince, valiant and wise, and according to the traditions of his race, a religious man." His sense of justice was never denied to anyone, regardless of their creed or origins. As a result of his justice, a Christian foreigner was said to have settled into Damascus, which was under Nur ad-Din's reign. Nur ad-Din was especially religious after his illness and his pilgrimage. He considered the crusaders foreigners in Muslim territory, who had come to Outremer to plunder the land and profane its sacred places. Nevertheless, he tolerated the Christians who lived under his authority, aside from the Armenians of Edessa, and regarded Emperor Manuel with deep respect. In contrast to Nur ad-Din's respectful reaction to the death of Baldwin III, Amalric I immediately besieged Banias upon learning of the emir's death, and extorted a vast amount of money from his widow.

During Nur ad-Din's reign, forty-two madrasas were built in Syria, of which half he personally sponsored. Through the construction of these madrasas Nur ad-Din was ensuring the creation of Sunni Islamic qadis and imams. Nur ad-Din himself enjoyed having specialists read to him from the Hadith, and his professors even awarded him a diploma in Hadith narration. He had bimaristans (hospitals) constructed in his cities as well, one of them is Nur al-Din Bimaristan and built caravanserais on the roads for travelers and pilgrims. He held court several times a week so that people could seek justice from him against his generals, governors, or other employees who had committed some crime.

Nur ad-Din's Sunni orthodoxy can be seen in his public works. His repair of the Roman aqueduct in Aleppo insinuated an anti-Shia polemic, and the conversion of two Shia mosques into madrasas, one Shafi'i another Hanafi, reinforce his insistence of promoting Sunni Islam. Consequently, in November 1148, he forbade the Shia call to prayer in Aleppo and any public displays of Shi'ism.

In the Muslim world he remains a legendary figure of military courage, piety, and modesty. Sir Steven Runciman said that he loved, above all else, justice.

The Damascene chronicler Ibn al-Qalanisi generally speaks of Nur ad-Din in majestic terms, although he himself died in 1160, and unfortunately did not witness the later events of Nur ad-Din's reign.

The Islamist group Harakat Nour al-Din al-Zenki, active in the Syrian Civil War in Aleppo since 2011, is named after Nur ad-Din.

Notes

References

Sources

The Damascus Chronicle of the Crusades, Extracted and Translated from the Chronicle of Ibn al-Qalanisi. H.A.R. Gibb, 1932 (reprint, Dover Publications, 2002)

121
 

William of Tyre, A History of Deeds Done Beyond the Sea, trans. E.A. Babcock and A.C. Krey. Columbia University Press, 1943.

Bibliography
.
 .

Sunni Muslims
Hanafis
Maturidis
Atabegs
Deaths from peritonsillar abscess
Muslims of the Second Crusade
People from Aleppo
Turkic rulers
Zengid rulers
12th-century Turkic people
1118 births
1174 deaths
People of the Nizari–Seljuk wars
Syrian people of Turkish descent